Puerta de Hierro means "Iron Gate" in Spanish. It may mean:
 Puerta de Hierro, Guadalajara
 Puerta de Hierro (Madrid)
 The Argentine film Puerta de Hierro, el exilio de Perón

See also
 Iron Gate (disambiguation)